Malcolm Johnston may refer to:

 Malcolm Johnston (soccer), Canadian soccer player
 Malcolm Johnston (jockey), Australian retired jockey